Serebrina is an Ediacaran encrusting macroscopic algae first discovered by Ischenko in 1983. Very little is known of this genus. It has been found in several formations in Ukraine and Russia.

Description 
Serebrina exhibits an encrusting growth form and is interpreted as a thallus, a plant body lacking leaves and stems.

Diversity 
A single species, S. crustacea, is known. The species name presumably derives from the encrusting life habit.

Discovery 
First described by Ischenko in 1983, Serebrina has later been found by several other paleontologists in abundance in the Verkhovka Formation in Ukraine.

Distribution 
Macroscopic algae tend to be rarer in the Ediacaran fauna and are usually found in finer sediments. Serebrina has been found in several deposits, such as Mezen Syneclise and the Zimnegory Formation in Russia. The exact number of specimens found is not known for certain.

Ecology 
Based on the little information available, Serebrina appears to encrust on hard surfaces.

See also 
 List of Ediacaran genera

References 

Ediacaran life